, abbreviated as NMU in English, is a public university (prefectural university) in Kashihara, Nara, Japan. Located near Kashihara Shrine, it is the only medical school in Nara Prefecture.

History 
During the World War II,  was established to supply surgeons for Imperial Army and Navy in April 1945.

After the war ended, in 1947, Nara Medical College was promoted to a university and renamed Nara Medical University.

In 2007, the College of Nursing, junior college of nursing established in 1996, was abolished and absorbed into School of Medicine (now Faculty of Nursing).

On July 8th, 2022 former Japanese Prime Minister Shinzo Abe was transported to Nara Medical University Hospital after being shot. He was shot at approximately 11:30 JST. Abe was shortly airlifted to Nara Medical University Hospital at 12:09 in cardiopulmonary arrest. At 5:03 Abe was declared dead, he died due to having bled to death from deep wounds to the heart and the front of his neck.

Organization

Programs 

 School of Medicine (医学部)
 Faculty of Medicine (医学科) - 6-year medical degree
 Faculty of Nursing (看護学科) - 4-year Bachelor of Nursing
 Graduate School of Medicine (医学研究科)
 Doctor Course - 4-year
 Master Course - 2-year

Nara Medical University Hospital 

The  is a hospital attached to the Nara Medical University. It is the hospital where former Japanese Prime Minister Shinzo Abe died of his wounds after his assassination on 8 July 2022.

College of Nursing
 was a public junior college associated with Nara Medical University, which opened in April 1996.

Notable alumni

 Osamu Tezuka (PhD): Mangaka, one of Japan's greatest mangaka

References

External links

 
 Nara Medical University Hospital's official website

Educational institutions established in 1945
Public universities in Japan
Medical schools in Japan
Universities and colleges in Nara Prefecture
1945 establishments in Japan